Bromfield is a civil parish in the borough of Allerdale in Cumbria, England.  It contains 20 listed buildings that are recorded in the National Heritage List for England.  Of these, one is listed at Grade I, the highest of the three grades, and the others are at Grade II, the lowest grade.  The parish contains the villages of Bromfield, Langrigg and Blencogo and the surrounding countryside.  Most of the listed buildings are houses and associated structures, or farmhouses and farm buildings.  The other listed buildings include a church, two milestones, a former windmill converted into a house, a well head, a war memorial, and a school.


Key

Buildings

References

Citations

Sources

Lists of listed buildings in Cumbria